Tabory ( Tabory) is a village in Ukraine located in the Zviahel Raion of the Zhytomyr Oblast. The territorial administrative code (KOATUUI) is 1820682602. It has a population of 438 people as of 2001. Its postal index is 12701 and its calling code is 4144.

The address of the village council is 12737, Ukraine, village Yosipovka and their telephone number is 79-5-42.

External links 
Tabory on website Verkhovna Rada of Ukraine 

Villages in Zviahel Raion